Ace Troubleshooter is the third studio album by American pop punk band Ace Troubleshooter and their debut on BEC. The songs "Misconceptions", "I Corinthians 13", "Don't Trust That Girl", and "Fortess" all appeared earlier on the band's second album, Don't Stop a Rockin'. The versions of these songs on this album are all re-recorded.  The album was recorded at the Blasting Room with Bill Stevenson and Stephen Egerton of Descendents/All.

Track listing
"SE #101" - 3:10
"Denise" - 4:15
"Tonight" - 4:26
"Misconceptions" - 3:33
"My Way" - 2:23
"Yesterday" - 3:37
"I Corinthians 13" - 3:05
"Don't Trust That Girl" - 3:16
"Phoenix" - 4:23
"Yoko" - 3:14
"Fortress" - 4:15

References

Ace Troubleshooter albums
2000 albums
Tooth & Nail Records albums